Kote may refer to:

 Kotë, a place in Albania
 Kote, Karnataka, a village in India
 Köte, a charcoal burner's hut in Germany's Harz Mountains
 Kote, a pair of mitts worn when practicing kendo
 KOTE is a radio station in Eureka, Kansas, playing country music.
 a diminutive of the South Slavic masculine given name Kostadin
 Kottas, a Slavic-speaking insurgent in Ottoman Macedonia